The NACAC Mountain Running Championships is an annual Mountain running competition organized by NACAC for athletes representing the countries of its member associations. Until 2012, only the participation of athletes from Canada, Mexico, and the United States was reported.  The event was established in 2004.

Editions

Results
Americans Morgan Arritola and Joe Gray won the women's and men's title respectively at the 2013 championships.

Men

Women

See also
World Mountain Running Championships
European Mountain Running Championships
South American Mountain Running Championships
World Long Distance Mountain Running Championships
Commonwealth Mountain and Ultradistance Running Championships

References

Mountain running competitions
Recurring sporting events established in 2004
NACAC competitions
Continental athletics championships